Discovery of the  fossil bird Gastornis parisiensis. 
Thomas Campbell Eyton plans a large natural history museum  at Eyton Hall.
Purple-crowned fairywren discovered on  Augustus Charles Gregory's northern Australian expedition.
Birds described in 1855 include Tickell's brown hornbill, Tristan thrush, robust white-eye, sapphire quail-dove,
William John Swainson and Louis Antoine François Baillon die. 
Howard Saunders begins bird studies in Brazil and Chile
Gustav Radde joins the East Siberian Expedition of 1855, led by the astronomer Ludwig Schwarz.
John Gould authors Descriptions of Eight New Species of Birds from South America. Proceedings of the Zoological Society of London 1855 Pt 23 no. 288: 67–70. online BHL 
Ongoing events
John Gould The birds of Australia; Supplement 1851–69. 1 vol. 81 plates; Artists: J. Gould and H. C. Richter; Lithographer: H. C. Richter
John Gould The birds of Asia; 1850-83 7 vols. 530 plates, Artists: J. Gould, H. C. Richter, W. Hart and J. Wolf; Lithographers:H. C. Richter and W. Hart

References

Bird
Birding and ornithology by year